Lac-Moncouche is an unorganized territory in the Canadian province of Quebec, located in the regional county municipality of Lac-Saint-Jean-Est. It had a population of 0 in the Canada 2011 Census and covers a land area of 264.90 km2, entirely within the Laurentides Wildlife Reserve.

See also
 List of unorganized territories in Quebec

References

Unorganized territories in Saguenay–Lac-Saint-Jean